Jan Kalvoda (born 30 October 1953) is a Czech lawyer and politician. He led the Civic Democratic Alliance and served as deputy prime minister and justice minister in the 1990s.

Early life
Kalvoda was born in 1953.

Career
Kalvoda is a lawyer by training. He was the chairman of the Civic Democratic Alliance (ODA) from 1992 to 1997. He resigned from office 17 December 1996, and Michael Žantovský became the ODA leader.

He served as deputy prime minister in the cabinet led by Prime Minister Václav Klaus from 2 July 1992 to 7 January 1997. He was in charge of the civil service and legislation. He was also justice minister in the cabinet from 1992 to 1996. He resigned from all of his posts in addition to his seat at the parliament on 16 December 1996. The reason for his resignation was that he lied about holding a PhD in law. Kalvoda admitted it.

References

1953 births
Civic Democratic Alliance MPs
Czechoslovak lawyers
Justice ministers of the Czech Republic
Living people
Civic Forum politicians
Leaders of the Civic Democratic Alliance
Politicians from Prague
Members of the Chamber of Deputies of the Czech Republic (1992–1996)
Charles University alumni